Guttorm Haraldsson was the first son of King Harald Fairhair of Norway and Åsa, daughter of Håkon Grjotgardsson, who was the first Earl of Lade.

Harald had wrested Rånrike in Viken from the Swedish King Erik Eymundsson.  Harald made Guttorm king over Rånrike and gave him the responsibility of defending southeast Norway from Sweden.

Guttorm fell in a sea battle against the sea-king Solve Huntiofsson (Solve Klove), son of Huntiof, King of Nordmøre. Solve Klove had earlier escaped capture at the First battle of Solskjel (ca. 870) in which both  King Huntiof and King Nokkve of Romsdal had been slain.

References

Other sources
 Sturluson, Snorri. Heimskringla: History of the Kings of Norway, translated Lee M. Hollander. Reprinted University of Texas Press, Austin, 1992.

Related Reading
Finlay, Alison (editor and translator) Fagrskinna, a Catalogue of the Kings of Norway (Brill Academic. 2004) 
Hermannsson, Halldór  (2009) Bibliography of the sagas of the kings of Norway (BiblioBazaar) 
Jones, Gwyn (1984) A History of the Vikings (Oxford University Press. 2nd ed) .

9th-century Norwegian nobility
10th-century Norwegian nobility
Fairhair dynasty
Norwegian petty kings